Hopewell Methodist Episcopal Church and Cemetery is a historic Methodist Episcopal church and cemetery located in Lagro Township, Wabash County, Indiana, USA. It was built in 1872 and is a one-room Gothic Revival style brick church. It has a front gable roof and features a bell tower and pointed arched windows. Also on the property is the contributing cemetery, which accepted its first burial in 1849, and the church's 19th century bell.

It was listed on the National Register of Historic Places in 2015.

References

Methodist churches in Indiana
Churches on the National Register of Historic Places in Indiana
Gothic Revival church buildings in Indiana
1849 establishments in Indiana
Churches completed in 1872
Buildings and structures in Wabash County, Indiana
National Register of Historic Places in Wabash County, Indiana